Grybas is a surname. Notable people with the surname include:

 Clinton Grybas (1975–2008), Australian sports commentator
 Vincas Grybas (1890–1941), Lithuanian sculptor